Siempre Selena is the second posthumously released album by American singer Selena, released by EMI Latin on October 29, 1996. The album contained mostly unreleased recordings and remixes of previously released content. Songs on the album range from a 14-year-old Selena on "Soy Amiga" (1986) to the shelved Don Juan DeMarco (1995) soundtrack song "Siempre Hace Frio". Siempre Selena was a result of the impact of Selena's death in March 1995, where the singer's father and manager Abraham Quintanilla Jr. began receiving requests from fans of her music. Abraham rediscovered forgotten tapes of songs Selena recorded for various projects. Following her death, Abraham expressed how he wanted to keep the singer's legacy alive and that public knowledge of Selena was very important to him. Critical reception of Siempre Selena was mixed, with varying reviews suggesting that the album was more for Selena's fan base and found no particular track on the album to be of any interest, while others favored its diversity and remastered songs.

Music retailers believed that Siempre Selena would be another sellout due to the commercial success of Dreaming of You (1995), as well as strong presale copies and demands for the album by fans, and by local disc jockeys who were hyping the album. Retailers reported "modest" sales, while other stores reported that sales for the album had flattened. Manolo Gonzalez, marketing director of EMI Latin, explained to media outlets how the company intentionally did not market Siempre Selena aggressively. An Austin American-Statesman editor called corporate EMI Latin's marketing team an "oxymoron" on their marketing scheme. Despite sluggish sales, Siempre Selena debuted and peaked atop the US Billboard Top Latin Albums and Regional Mexican Albums chart with 10,500 units sold in its first week. It peaked at number 82 on the Billboard 200 chart. It remained at number one for two consecutive weeks on the Top Latin Albums chart and 14 consecutive weeks atop the Regional Mexican Albums chart. The lead single, "Siempre Hace Frio" peaked at number two on the US Billboard Hot Latin Songs and Regional Mexican Songs chart, while "Costumbres" peaked within the top 15. In November 2017, the Recording Industry Association of America (RIAA) has certified the album triple platinum for shipments of 300,000 units in the United States.

Background 
In March 1995, American Tejano music singer Selena was shot and killed by Yolanda Saldívar, her friend and former manager of the singer's boutiques. At the time of her death the singer was working on a crossover album that would have propelled her into the American pop arena. The impact of the singer's death had a negative impact on Latin music, her genre—which she catapulted it into the mainstream market—suffered and its popularity waned following Selena's death. The crossover-planned album Dreaming of You was released posthumously in July 1995, debuting and peaking atop the United States Billboard 200 albums chart, the first majority Spanish-language recording to do so in the chart's history. The album's release started a "buying frenzy" for anything related or containing Selena among Hispanic and Latino Americans. Selena's father and manager Abraham Quintanilla Jr. explained to Mario Taradell of The Odessa American that "there is an insatiable hunger for Selena's music out there". He further said how he constantly receives letters and phone calls from fans requesting the singer's music. Following his daughter's death, Abraham began going through boxes and found "more songs that Selena recorded that we had forgotten about." He explained how he wanted to preserve Selena's legacy and that it's important to him that public consciousness of the singer remains intact. Selena's brother and principal record producer, A.B. Quintanilla explained on Biography that Selena's wishes were for her fans to "never forget about her". Since Selena's death, her family has been criticized by fans and the media for exploiting the singer and cannibalizing on her murder by releasing more music.

Music and lyrics 
Siempre Selena contains mostly unreleased recordings and remixes of previously released content. The oldest song on the album, "Soy Amiga" was recorded when Selena was 14-years old. Taradell called it a "breezy Latin pop number." and found that the singer's vocals "were kept intact but the music was redone to fit today's radio sound." Chris Riemenschneider of the Austin American-Statesman did not approve of the remastered version of "Soy Amiga", calling it a "fluffy pop song" that lacks "any passion." Along with "Soy Amiga", other songs on the album including, "Como Quisiera" and "Costumbres", were released prior to Selena signing a recording contract with EMI Latin in 1989. "Como Quisiera" was originally a "Tex Mex tune" and remixed into a midtempo mariachi recording, while Juan Gabriel's "Costumbres", was turned into a "feisty yet palatable cumbia style" track. Lyrically, "Como Quisiera" is about a girl who "deeply loves" a guy who broke her heart. The unreleased demo that was intended for the crossover market, "Only Love", was recorded in 1990 and was shelved. Abraham told Taradell how the song was "too adult contemporary and we wanted to go with something more pop." Taradell called it a "faceless pop ballad." while editors of the Orlando Sentinel called it a contemporary R&B track about "whether to go on with life without the man she loves." Taradell found "A Million to One" as being "a slightly sensuous flavor" due to the introduction of the saxophone on the recording. Riemenschneider found "Only Love" and "A Million to One" to be musically similar as "jazz-light" numbers that failed to convey the singer as having mainstream potential. The producers of the soundtrack of the 1995 romantic comedy-drama film Don Juan DeMarco—in which Selena played a mariachi singer—decided not to include her recordings of "Tú Sólo Tú", "El Toro Relajo", and "Siempre Hace Frio". Christopher John Farley of Time magazine said the producers who excluded the songs regretted this move following the impact of Selena's death. The latter two were included on the Dreaming of You album, while "Siempre Hace Frio" was added to the Siempre Selena set list. "Siempre Hace Frio", which is a "soulful mariachi song." lyrically describes a woman who wants her boyfriend back, though he is with another girl. Riemenschneider called the track a "lazy, mournful mariachi" that finds Selena "belting her own special borderland blues, but she leaves little to cry at the end." He added how "Selena's doubters who think she was more about image than talent" should listen to "Siempre Hace Frio". He wrote shock jock Howard Stern—who poke fun of the singer's death and her mourners—as one of those "Selena's doubters".

Songs such as "No Quiero Saber", "Ya No", and "Tu Robaste Mi Corazon" have all been remixed. "Tu Robaste Mi Corazon", originally recorded as a duet with Emilio Navaira, was re-recorded with Pete Astudillo, former Selena y Los Dinos band member. The remix version of "No Quiero Saber" on the album was remixed in early March 1996 for the 1996 Summer Olympics Latin-themed album, Voces Unidas. It entered the US Billboard Hot Latin Songs chart at number 35 in the week ending May 11. It peaked at number six on the week ending June 22, 1996, while peaking at number 10 a week later on the Latin Pop Songs chart. "Siempre Hace Frio" was released as the lead single from the album in October 1996, it debuted at number 21 on the Hot Latin Songs chart and number ten on the US Billboard Regional Mexican Songs chart. It peaked at number two on the Hot Latin Songs and Regional Mexican Songs chart in its seventh week, following the album's debut on the Top Latin Albums chart. It remained at number two on the Regional Mexican Songs chart for three consecutive weeks, and four consecutive weeks at number two on the Hot Latin Songs charts before falling. "Costumbres" was released as the final single in January 1997, debuting at number 24 on the Hot Latin Songs chart in the week ending January 25. In its second week Selena's version outperformed Banda El Recodo's version on the Hot Latin Songs chart on the week ending February 1. In the following week, "Costumbres" peaked at number 15. At the 1997 Tejano Music Awards, "Siempre Hace Frio" won the Tejano Music Award for Song of the Year, while "No Quiero Saber" won Crossover Song of the Year.

Critical reception 

Mario Tarradell of The Odessa American called the album "Selena's musical scrapbook." He favored its diversity, calling it "more impressive than most posthumous repackingings" essentially for having previously unreleased tracks. He believed it was "timed to set up the media blitz" on the then-upcoming soundtrack to the Selena biopic. The Desert Suns Fred Shuster panned the album as "second-rate material at best." He called the ballads on the album "dreary" and found the album to be generated towards "fans awaiting the Selena movie." Shuster noted that if the listener has "a weakness to slow love songs [then] forget it." Because of the new mixes and unreleased content, Natalia Pignato and Umatilla High of the Orlando Sentinel reported that they "love this CD" and that it displays "the bittersweet success of unfulfilled promise." In a poll conducted by News-Press in January 1997, DJs were asked to pick their top ten albums they would bring on a deserted island, Siempre Selena was among those chosen.

AllMusic called Siempre Selena a "posthumous collection of rarities and lesser-known songs." The website found the album to be "of interest to dedicated fans" and noted that there "are a few worthwhile items" throughout the recording. Ramiro Burr wrote in The Billboard Guide to Tejano and Regional Mexican Music (1999), that Siempre Selena contained "vocal tracks [that] were lifted and combined with different instrumental tracks". John Lannert of Billboard magazine called the album "a collection of previously unreleased English- and Spanish-language tracks" with what he said to be "sonically touched up early Latino numbers". Paul Verna, also from Billboard, called the recording as "slickly packaged" and a "so-so grab bag [that contains] romantic ballads" that he believed "is sure to appeal to [Selena's fan base] vast and loyal legion of fans". He found that Selena's fan base has "not grown weary of slow-paced love songs [such as] "Como Quisiera" and "Tu Robaste Mi Corazon." Riemenschneider found the album to "[offer] a wide and impressive range of mostly unheard music from Selena's too short career." He opined that Siempre Selena "proves [the singer] was the queen of her domain."

Commercial performance 
On October 19, 1996, it was revealed that Siempre Selena would be commercially available on October 29. Local music shops reported that interest in the album reached far back as a few weeks before the album was released. Local Tejano disc jockeys further hyped the craze predicting that the album would be "wildly popular" because of Selena's fans. Presale copies and interest in the album gave music retailers high hopes for the recording, believing it would be a sellout. Roughly 500 people had pre-screened the album at Hastings Books in Midland, Texas, the night before it went on sale. Music retailers were flabbergasted that sales for the album had flattened, though reported that sales were "modest". According to South Texas music retailers, sales for the album were considerably lower in comparison to Dreaming of You. All That Music in El Paso reportedly was "busy [in] filling the demand for [the album]", while other stores in the same area reported that "sales were slow". The album wasn't selling much but "a handful of copies" at a Blockbuster Music store in San Antonio. Local businesses predicted that sales would eventually pick up towards Christmas. Marketing director of EMI Latin, Manolo Gonzalez expressed how the company intentionally went "low-key" in marketing Siempre Selena in comparison to Dreaming of You. Gonzalez said how he wanted to be "very conservative with this album" and that EMI Latin had shipped 400,000 units throughout the United States. Riemenschneider called EMI Latin and the singer's family an "oxymoron" for their marketing scheme, or rather lack thereof of Siempre Selena. Riemenschneider believed their reasoning behind the insignificant promotion to be an avoidance of "Selena overkill" with the soundtrack and biopic that were due in a few months. He found their move in having little promotion to be a "mistake", calling Siempre Selena the one "Selena's caretakers should have promoted [following her death]".

The album became a sleeper hit, debuting atop the US Billboard Top Latin Albums and Regional Mexican Albums chart with 10,500 units sold in the week ending November 23, 1996. On the Billboard 200, Siempre Selena debuted and peaked at number 82. The album also helped increased sales to Selena's other works, including Dreaming of You and Amor Prohibido (1994). After two weeks at number one, Siempre Selena was displaced by Julio Iglesias' Tango album in the week ending December 7. Siempre Selena finished 1996 as the 44th best-selling Latin album of the year, her Dreaming of You album remained that year's best-selling record. After 14 consecutive weeks at number one on the Regional Mexican Albums chart, Siempre Selena was dethroned by Grupo Limite's Partiendome el Alma. On its 19th week, the album regain the number one position on the Regional Mexican Albums chart on the week ending March 29, 1997, following the release of the Selena soundtrack. During the second anniversary of the singer's death on March 31, sales of Siempre Selena jumped 48% remaining atop the Regional Mexican Albums chart and climbing the Top Latin Albums chart at number three, a position higher from the previous week. The album remained at number one for three additional weeks before it fell from the top spot on the week ending May 10. It was subsequently nominated for Female Album of the Year at the 1997 Billboard Latin Music Awards. In its quarterly recap of the top selling Latin albums of 1997, Siempre Selena ranked third behind Enrique and Julio Iglesias' albums, respectively. The recording finished 1997 as the fourth best-selling Latin album in the United States, while it finished second on the Regional Mexican Albums year-end list. In December 2002, the RIAA certified Siempre Selena double platinum for shipments of 200,000 units; her 10th certified album. They re-certified the recording triple platinum (180,000 album-equivalent units sold) in November 2017.

Track listing

Credits and personnel 
Credits adapted from the liner notes of Siempre Selena.

Vocal credits
Selena – vocals, composer
Rebecca Valdez – background vocals
Mariachi Sol de Mexico – background vocals
Jessie Garcia – background vocals
Pete Astudillo – background vocals

Instruments
Ismael Espinoza – violin
Miguel Guzman – violin
Carlos Rosas – violin
Jose M. Vargas – violin
Rafael Garcia – trumpet
Fabian Maltos – accordion 
Joe Posada – saxophone
A.B. Quintanilla – bajo sexto, bass
Ricky Vela – keyboards
Ray Paz – keyboards
Chris Perez – guitar
Jesse Garcia – guitar 
Jesse Ybarra – guitar
Henry Gomez – vihuela
Mateo Garcia – requinto
Brian "Red" Moore – bajo sexto, bass

Technical and production credits
Pete Astudillo – composer
Robbie Buchanan – composer
Alberto Cervantes – composer
Ruben Fuentes – composer
Juan Gabriel – composer
Simon Gallup – composer
Phil Medley – composer
Cuco Sanchez – composer
Robert Smith – composer
Mark Spiro – composer
Laurence Tolhurst – composer
Ricky Vela – composer
A.B. Quintanilla – composer, executive producer
Brian "Red" Moore – engineer, producer 
Nelson Gonzalez – supervisor producer

Visuals and imagery
Paul Wenzel – art direction

Charts

Weekly charts

Quarterly charts

Year-end charts

Certifications

See also 

 1996 in Latin music
 Selena albums discography
 List of number-one Billboard Top Latin Albums from the 1990s
 List of number-one Billboard Regional Mexican Albums of 1996
 Latin American music in the United States

References

Bibliography

External links 

1996 greatest hits albums
Albums produced by A.B. Quintanilla
Compilation albums published posthumously
EMI Latin compilation albums
Remix albums published posthumously
Selena compilation albums
Spanish-language albums